Events in the year 2021 in Slovakia.

Incumbents
President: Zuzana Čaputová
Prime Minister: 
Igor Matovič (until 1 April) 
Eduard Heger (from 1 April)

Events
Ongoing — COVID-19 pandemic in Slovakia
21 to 26 September – 2021 ICF Canoe Slalom World Championships, to be held in the Bratislava.

Deaths

31 January – Andrej Hryc, actor (born 1949).

References

 
2020s in Slovakia
Years of the 21st century in Slovakia
Slovakia
Slovakia